Vaca Nunatak is the southernmost nunatak of Panzarini Hills, in the Argentina Range, Pensacola Mountains. Mapped by United States Geological Survey (USGS) from surveys and U.S. Navy air photos, 1956–67. Named by Advisory Committee on Antarctic Names (US-ACAN) for Captain Jose M.T. Vaca, Argentine officer in charge of General Belgrano Station, winter 1961.
 

Nunataks of Queen Elizabeth Land